Govindacharya Bhimacharya Joshi was an Indian playwright in the 1950s. He was born in Hombal village in Gadag district of Karnataka state in 1904. He established a theatre group named Vasudeva Vinodini Natya Samsthe at Bagalkot and another theatre group named Kalopasaka Mandali in Dharwad in 1954. He was also a founder publisher of Manohara Granthamala which has published the works of Jnanapeetha awardee D.R. Bendre, V.K. Gokak, Shivaram Karanth, A.N. Krishna Rao, Shankar Mokashi Punekar, N. Kasturi, R. S. Mugali, Keertinath Kurtakoti, Chandrashekhara Kambara, Girish Karnad, V. Sitaramaiah and several others.

Notable works
Playwrights
 Aa Ooru Ee Ooru
 Kadadida Neeru 
 Mooka Bali
 Nane Bijjala
 Nakrasheela 
 Parimaladavaru
 Sattavara Neralu directed by B.V. Karanth in 1974 

Novels
 Aa Ooru Ee Ooru
 Dharmasere (1934)
 Mooka Bali (1956)
 Neeru

Awards
He received the Padma Shri award in 1986 and Sangeet Natak Akademi Award in 1989 for his contribution to theatre. The Karnataka Government has honoured him in 1983 and 1986 for his cultural contributions.

References

People from Gadag district
Dramatists and playwrights from Karnataka
Kannada-language writers
20th-century Indian dramatists and playwrights
1904 births
1993 deaths
Recipients of the Sangeet Natak Akademi Award